Brian Mansfield (born September 24, 1963) is an American writer and journalist.

Early life and education 
Mansfield grew up in Nashville, Tennessee. He graduated from David Lipscomb High School.

In 1984, Mansfield received a bachelor's degree cum laude from Berklee College of Music. From 1984 to 1987 he attended Belmont University in Nashville, taking classes in journalism and the music industry.

Career 
From 1988 to 1991, Mansfield was entertainment editor at Nashville Scene. He then began working as a freelance reporter covering music for The Tennessean in 1993. From 1993 to 1997, Mansfield was the Nashville editor of New Country magazine. He was Nashville editor of CountryNow.com from 1997 to 1999, then a senior editor at CD Now from 1999-2003.

From 1997 to 2015, Mansfield was the Nashville correspondent for USA Today. During this time he also provided commentary on American Idol at the Idol Chatter blog for USA Today.

In addition to his 18 years as a music writer and critic for USA Today, from 2004 to 2014, Mansfield was the writer/producer of a syndicated weekly radio program about the Grand Ole Opry called America's Opry Weekend for American radio network Dial Global Radio Networks, which was syndicated by Westwood One. Starting in 2009, Mansfield has produced a weekly live concert series for the Grand Ole Opry called Opry Country Classics. 

In 2015, Mansfield joined the public relations firm, Shore Fire Media, as content director.

Mansfield is the editor and writer of six books.

Personal life 
In 1989, Mansfield married Nancy Mansfield (née McDoniel). They have four children.

In 2012, Mansfield was diagnosed with and successfully battled colon cancer. He has a genetic disease called Lynch Syndrome, which is a hereditary disorder.

Membership 
 2002-2006: Country Music Association, Board Member

Works and publications

Books

Selected writing 
Music
 
 
 
 
 
 

 My Semicolon Life series

References

External links

 
 Brian Mansfield at Shore Fire Media
 Brian Mansfield at USA Today

American music critics
American music journalists
USA Today journalists
1963 births
Living people